Masanori Sera is a Japanese singer and actor from Fukuyama Hiroshima. He graduated from Osaka University of Arts. As a singer Sera's rock band, Sera Masanori&TWIST appeared in the Kōhaku Uta Gassen twice (1978 and 1979). He made his solo debut with the single Tokyo rouge (Tokyo指紅) in 1982.

As an actor, he apparered in popular detective drama Taiyō ni Hoero! from 1982 to 1984. In 1998, he won Best Supporting Actor award at the 22nd Japan Academy Prize (film award)) for his role in Dr. Akagi.

Discography
Singles
Anta no Ballard (1977)
Yado Nashi(1978)
Hikigane (1978)
Saga (1978)
Moero Iionna (1979)
Soppo (1979)
Love Song (1980)
Set me free (1981)
Doukasen (1984)
Against The Wind (1986)
Heart Is Gold (1987)
Yatterman no Uta (2008)
Itsumo no Uta (2015)
Anatani (2020)
On the Sunny side of the street (2022)

Albums
Masanori Sera (1982)
Iam (1985)
Fine and you? (1985)
Be Fine (1986)
THIS IS (1986)
Tough in the city (1987)
Nemurenai Machi (1990)
Fun to Fun (1991)
Return (1992)
Do (1995)
Born to be Rockin (2001)
1977 (2002)
Show Twist songs (2003)
We are Guild9 (2007)
UNDER COVER Sera Masanori solo singles (2008)
the ultimate WE ARE GUILD9 (2012)
BACKBONE (2012)
Otoko no Uta (2015)
Premium BEST Songs&Live (2015)
Howling Wolves (2017)

Filmography

Film
 W's Tragedy (1984)
 Aitsu ni Koishite (1987)
 Onihei's Detective Records (1995)
 Dr. Akagi (1998)
 Whistleblower (2019)
 Little Love Song (2019)

Television
 Taiyō ni Hoero! (1982–84) as Hajime Kasukabe (Bogey)
 Shadow Warriors (1985) as Ryoma Sakamoto
 Marumo no Okite (2011) as Yosuke Hatanaka
 Umechan Sensei (2012) as Shunichiro Sakata
 Downtown Rocket (2016)
 Come Come Everybody (2021)

Dubbing
 Lethal Weapon 2'' as Detective Martin Riggs (Mel Gibson)

References

External links
 Masanori Sera Official
 Masanori Sera imdb

1955 births
Actors from Hiroshima
Japanese male film actors
Japanese male rock singers
Japanese male stage actors
Japanese male television actors
Living people
Musicians from Hiroshima
People from Fukuyama, Hiroshima
20th-century Japanese male actors
20th-century Japanese male singers
20th-century Japanese singers
21st-century Japanese male actors
21st-century Japanese male singers
21st-century Japanese singers